Akhila Kishore (born 2 April 1989) is an Indian actress who has appeared in Kannada and Tamil language films. After making her debut in the Kannada film Padhe Padhe  (2013).She won critical acclaim for her performances in Kathai Thiraikathai Vasanam Iyakkam (2014).

Career
After completing her college and gaining a BE in Computer Science from the Global Academy of Technology, the 6 feet tall Akhila chose to venture into modelling and gained success participating in beauty pageants. She received recognition, gaining awards at the Femina Miss India Bangalore 2013 competition including MISS FASHION ICON along with	Sobhita Dhulipala  . Akhila made her film debut with the 2013 Kannada film, Padhe Padhe, with a critic noting she was "good" for the role. The actress was then asked to audition for a role in Kathai Thiraikathai Vasanam Iyakkam by director R. Parthiepan, and was subsequently selected to work on the film alongside several other newcomers. The film won positive reviews, as did Akhila for her performance, and she was subsequently signed on to work on the sequel.

She subsequently signed on to appear in a role alongside Santhanam in Inimey Ippadithan, which released in June 2015. 
She completed Masters from San Jose State University and working in Intel. She got married on 2 December 2018 to Alankrit Chona.

Filmography

References

External links

Indian film actresses
Actresses in Tamil cinema
Living people
1989 births
Actresses from Bangalore
Actresses in Kannada cinema
21st-century Indian actresses